Tappeh Torkaman (also Romanized as Tappeh Torkamān) is a village in Torkaman Rural District, in the Central District of Urmia County, West Azerbaijan Province, Iran. At the 2006 census, its population was 437, in 120 families.

References 

Populated places in Urmia County